Kenyoreicheia aberdarensis is a species of beetle in the family Carabidae, the only species in the genus Kenyoreicheia.

References

Scaritinae